Citrus wintersii, the Brown River finger lime, is a shrub native to the Brown River region in Papua-New Guinea. It was previously known as Microcitrus papuana. It has, as the "finger" name suggests, a small, thin fruit, pointed at both ends. It grows near Port Moresby.

Fruit is green, never yellow.

References

Bushfood
Plants described in 1976
Edible plants
wintersii
Flora of New Guinea
wintersii